Curramulka is a town in the Australian state of South Australia on the Yorke Peninsula.

Nearby is an extensive chain of limestone caves. They were first explored in 1850, and major extensions discovered in 1984. They have 14 km of known passages in an area of approximately 400m x 300m and depth 46m. Corra-Lynn is the longest cave in the region.

History
Curramulka is one of the oldest townships on the Peninsula, the Hundred of Curramulka being proclaimed on 31 December 1874. The name is derived from 'curre' (emu) and 'mulka' (deep water hole). Emus used to drink here, and thus it was named by the indigenous inhabitants.

Farming land was first opened up in the mid-1870s and Curramulka enjoyed its heyday in the late 19th and early 20th centuries when most farming produce moved through nearby Port Julia.

The town's commercial importance dwindled when Ardrossan to the north became the main regional port for wheat and wool, but recent signs indicate that Curramulka is back in a strong growth mode.

Local School
The primary school located in Curramulka is in need of a few more students as its numbers are plummeting below the population count of just 50. Though the staff at Curramulka are happy with not having to account for many students, they also like having more company as they attend their current duties.

Bushfire 
On 19 November 2009 a large fire started in paddocks near Curramulka. The front was about 700 metres long and burnt about 400 hectares.
The fire was soon terminated and had caused minimal damage to local areas with the exception of a few paddocks burnt.

See also
List of cities and towns in South Australia

References

External links 

   Yorke Peninsula website